James Ormond (born 20 August 1977) is an English former cricketer. He played two test matches for the England cricket team and in total made 137 first class appearances.

Early life

James grew up playing club cricket at Corley CC and established himself as a hard hitting fast bowling all rounder creating batting as well as bowling records.

Role
Ormond was a right-handed batsman and a right-arm medium-fast bowler although he has also bowled off-spin in his second and final Test match against India in Mohali.

Career

Ormond made his first-class debut in 1995 for Leicestershire County Cricket Club and played a part in the successful championship seasons of 1996 and 1998. Ormond had several consistent seasons at Leicestershire which saw him get rewarded with representation for England at Under-19 level and places on England A tours of Kenya and Sri Lanka.

Ormond eventually made his full Test debut against Australia in 2001. He was then picked for the tour of India where he played his second and final Test match. His two Test wickets were Ricky Ponting and Rahul Dravid.

After he returned to England he moved from Leicestershire to Surrey, where he won another County Championship title in his first season. He remained at the club until the end of the 2009 season when he was released. He is presently cricket coach at Stockport Grammar School.

Ormond was involved in a notable piece of sledging; when, in a Test match against Australia in 2001, Mark Waugh asked him, "Mate, what are you doing out here? There's no way you're good enough to play for England." Ormond replied "Maybe not, but at least I'm the best player in my own family", a reference to Waugh's brother Steve, who was the captain of the Australian team.

Ormond was criticised for being overweight while an England player.

References

External links

1977 births
Cricketers from Coventry
Living people
England Test cricketers
English cricketers
Leicestershire cricketers
Surrey cricketers
NBC Denis Compton Award recipients
First-Class Counties Select XI cricketers